Associazione Sportiva Dilettantistica Villafranca is an Italian association football club, based in Villafranca di Verona, Veneto. It currently plays in Serie D.

History

The foundation 
The club was founded in 1920.

Serie D 
At the end of the 2010–11 Serie D season, Villafranca was relegated to Eccellenza after the play-out, but on 5 August 2011 it was readmitted to fill vacancies.

In the season 2011–12 it was again relegated to Eccellenza.

Colors and badge 
The team's colors are white and dark blue.

References

External links 
Official homepage

Football clubs in Italy
Football clubs in Veneto
Association football clubs established in 1920
1920 establishments in Italy
Villafranca di Verona